The National Belizean Alliance was a group of third parties contesting the 2008 general elections in Belize.

Formation 
The NBA was formed in October 2007 in Belize City between the We the People Reform Movement (WTP), People's National Party (PNP), and a group from Cayo called Christians Pursuing Reform. Since then it has released several statements criticizing the ruling People's United Party (PUP).

Leaders 
 Wil Maheia, Dionisio Choc (PNP)
 Hipolito Bautista (WTP)
 Richard Smith (CPR)

See also 
 We the People Reform Movement
 People's National Party

 
2007 establishments in Belize
Defunct political parties in Belize